The Chief Minister of Jharkhand is the chief executive of the Indian state of Jharkhand. In accordance with the Constitution of India, the governor is a state's de jure head, but de facto executive authority rests with the chief minister. Following elections to the legislative assembly, the state's governor usually invites the party (or coalition) with a majority of seats to form the government. The governor appoints the chief minister, whose council of ministers are collectively responsible to the assembly. Given the confidence of the assembly, the chief minister's term is for five years and is subject to no term limits.

Six people have served as the state's chief minister since Jharkhand's formation on 15 November 2000. Half of them, including the inaugural officeholder Babulal Marandi, represented the Bharatiya Janata Party (BJP). His successor Arjun Munda, also from the BJP, is the longest-serving chief minister; he served for over five years, across three terms but never completed a full term. Two chief ministers, Shibu Soren and his son Hemant Soren, represented the Jharkhand Mukti Morcha (JMM). Shibu Soren's first term ended in just ten days, as he could not prove that he had the support of a majority of the house and was forced to resign. The state has also been governed by Madhu Koda, one of the few independents to become the chief minister of any state. In between their reigns, the state has also been under President's rule three times. Raghubar Das, of the BJP, was the first chief minister to complete a full term in the state. Hemant Soren of the Jharkhand Mukti Morcha is the incumbent chief minister.

Chief Ministers of Jharkhand

Timeline

Notes

References

 
Jharkhand
Chief Ministers